The Cimetière Saint-Pierre is the largest cemetery in the city of Marseille, Southern France.

Location
It is located at number 380 on Rue Saint-Pierre in the 5th arrondissement of Marseille.

Overview
The cemetery is the third largest cemetery in France after the Cimetière parisien de Pantin and the Cimetière parisien de Thiais, both of which are located in the Parisian region. It was established on 25 September 1855. However, it was only inaugurated on 30 December 1863.

Notable burials

Artists
 Antonin Artaud (1896–1948), playwright
 Léo Nègre (1906–1998), songwriter
 Edmond Rostand (1868–1918), playwright
 Vincent Scotto (1874–1952), music composer
 Henri Verneuil (1920–2002), screenwriter
 Alibert (1889–1951), actor
 Rellys (1905–1991), actor
 Gaby Deslys (1881–1920), singer
 Berthe Sylva (1885–1941), singer
 Ernest Reyer (1823–1909), music composer
 Émile Loubon (1809–1863), painter
 Pierre Ambrogiani (1906–1985), painter
 Valère Bernard (1860–1936), painter
 Charles Camoin (1879–1965), painter
 Antoine Marius Gianelli (1896–1983), painter
 Paul Gondard (1884–1953), sculptor
 Henri Christiné (1867–1941), music composer
 Andrée Turcy (1891–1974), actor
 Élie-Jean Vézien (1890–1982), sculptor
 Auguste Vimar (1851–1916), illustrator
 André Roussin (1911–1987), playwright
 Constant Roux (1869–1942), sculptor
 Antoine Sartorio (1885–1988), sculptor
 Louis Ducreux (1911–1992), screenwriter
 Antoine Ferrari (1910–1995), painter
 Milly Mathis (1901–1965), actor
 Alida Rouffe (1874–1949), actor
 Jean-Vital Jammes (1825–1893), opera singer
 René Sarvil (1901–1975), actor
 Gabriel Signoret (1878–1937), actor
 Adolphe Joseph Thomas Monticelli (1824–1886), painter
 Alphonse Moutte (1840–1913), painter
 Dominique Piazza (1860–1941), illustrator

Politicians and military personnel
 Charles Armand Septime de Faÿ de La Tour-Maubourg (1801–1845), diplomat and politician
 Alphonse Esquiros (1812–1876), poet and politician
 Joseph Thierry (1857–1918), politician
 Albert Littolff (1911–1943), military pilot
 François Charles-Roux (1879–1961), diplomat
 Émile Muselier (1882–1965), resistant
 Germaine Poinso-Chapuis (1901–1981), politician
 Gaston Defferre (1910–1986), politician
 Georges N'Guyen Van Loc (1933–2008), intelligence chief

Sportspeople
 Gunnar Andersson (1928–1969), football player
 Raymond Grassi (1930–1953), boxer
 Luc Borrelli (1965–1999), football player
 Jean Bouin (1888–1914), runner
 Gustave Ganay (1892–1926), cyclist
 Henri Rougier (1876–1956), cyclist

Other
 Alexandre Chabanon (1873–1936), missionary in Indochina
 Gaétan Picon, inventor of Sirop de Picon
 Louis Noilly and Claudius Prat, founders of Noilly Prat
 Jules Charles-Roux (1841–1918), businessman and philanthropist
 Gustave Desplaces (1820–1869), engineer
 Pascal Coste (1787–1879), architect
 Nicolas Paquet (1831–1909), businessman
 Michel-Robert Penchaud (1772–1833), architect
 Eugène Rostand (1843–1915), economist
 Joseph Héliodore Garcin de Tassy (1794–1878), academic
 Antoine Clot (1793–1868), physician and philanthropist
 Aimé Olivier de Sanderval (1840–1919), explorer
 Antoine-Fortuné Marion (1846–1900), botanist
 Jacques de Morgan (1857–1924), explorer

References

External links

5th arrondissement of Marseille
Buildings and structures in Marseille
Saint-Pierre
Tourist attractions in Marseille
1855 establishments in France